The Men's slalom competition of the Grenoble 1968 Olympics was held at Chamrousse.

The defending world champion was Carlo Senoner of Italy, while France's Jean-Claude Killy was the defending World Cup slalom champion and Switzerland's Dumeng Giovanoli was the leader of the 1968 World Cup.

Final

Classification

Round One
The top two in each heat advanced directly to the final, with the other racers moving to the second round.

Heat A

Heat B

Heat C

Heat D

Heat E

Heat F

Heat G

Heat H

Heat I

Heat J

Heat K

Heat L

Heat M

Heat N

Heat O

Heat P

Heat Q

Round Two

The winner of each heat advanced to the final.

Heat A

Heat B

Heat C

Heat D

Heat E

Heat F

Heat G

Heat H

Heat I

Heat J

Heat K

Heat L

Heat M

Heat N

Heat O

Heat P

Heat Q

References 

Men's slalom
Winter Olympics